The Austrian Men's Curling Championship is the national championship of men's curling in Austria. It has been held annually since 1982. It is organized by the Austrian Curling Association.

List of champions and medallists
(Team line-up in order: skip (marked bold), third, second, lead, alternate(s), coach)

References

See also
Austrian Women's Curling Championship
Austrian Mixed Curling Championship
Austrian Mixed Doubles Curling Championship
Austrian Junior Curling Championships

Curling competitions in Austria

National curling championships
Recurring sporting events established in 1982
1982 establishments in Austria
Curling